Queen Kong is a 1976 British-German adventure comedy film parodying King Kong. The film was never released theatrically in the United Kingdom, due to legal action by Dino De Laurentiis, producer of the 1976 King Kong remake and RKO, the copyright holder of King Kong at the time.  It got a limited release in Italy and Germany. The film has since resurfaced on DVD.

The film has a cult following in Japan. In 1998, a troupe of Japanese comedians produced their own Japanese dialogue for the film, in a similar spirit to Woody Allen's What's Up, Tiger Lily?; this version with the new Japanese dialogue was released on DVD in 2001. The film was novelized by James Moffat and published by Everest Books in 1977.

It was shot at Shepperton Studios and on location around London and Newhaven. In addition, miniature sets were created utilising the scale model of London at the now long-defunct Bournemouth theme park Tucktonia.

Plot
This film switches the traditional roles of females and males and reverses the sexes of the original cast of King Kong. The main character Ray Fay plays the damsel in distress, which tends to usually be played by women. He is kidnapped by film director Luce Habit to star in her new African jungle movie. He then finds himself the attraction of an amorous giant female gorilla that pursues him across London.

Main cast
Robin Askwith as Ray Fay 
Rula Lenska as Luce Habit 
Valerie Leon as Queen of the Nabongas 
Roger Hammond  as Woolf 
Linda Hayden as the Singing Nun 
John Clive as Comedian 
Carol Drinkwater as Ima Goodbody 
Anthony Morton as Antique Dealer 
Vicki Michelle as Crew Girl
 Anna Bergman as Crew Girl 
 Geraldine Gardner as Crew Girl 
 Jeannie Collings as Crew Girl

References

External links

 Queen Kong on Nanarland

Fictional queens
1976 films
1970s fantasy comedy films
1970s monster movies
King Kong (franchise) films
1970s parody films
1970s adventure comedy films
British parody films
Constantin Film films
Films set in London
1976 comedy films
Films shot at Shepperton Studios
British monster movies
British natural horror films
British comedy horror films
1970s English-language films
1970s British films
1970s Japanese films